Albert Count Vandal (7 July 1853, Paris – 30 August 1910, Paris) was a French historian, born in Paris.  He wrote:

 En karriole à travers la Suède et la Norvège (1876)  
 Louis XV et Elizabeth de Russie (1882)  
 Ambassade française en Orient sous Louis XV (1887)  
 Napoléon et Alexandre Ier (three volumes, 1894-97), awarded the Vaubert prize  
 Les voyages du Marquis de Nointel (1900)  
 L'avènement de Bonaparte'' (1902)

Vandal was elected to the Académie française in 1897, and he succeeded his teacher and friend, Albert Sorel as professor at the school of political science.

External links
 Short biography
 
 
 

1853 births
1910 deaths
Writers from Paris
19th-century French historians
19th-century French writers
French educators
Members of the Académie Française
Chevaliers of the Légion d'honneur
Members of the Ligue de la patrie française
French male non-fiction writers